The 2019–20 season is Central Córdoba's 1st season back in the top division of Argentine football, after promotion from Primera B Nacional. In addition to the Primera División, the club are competing in the Copa Argentina and Copa de la Superliga.

The season generally covers the period from 1 July 2019 to 30 June 2020.

Review

Pre-season
Matías Pato returned from his loan spell in the preceding season with Chaco For Ever on 30 June 2019, as did the players loaned in. Fernando Piñero joined Santamarina on 1 July. Four new signings were confirmed by Central Córdoba on 2 July, as Marcelo Meli's loan signing from Racing Club was followed by the permanent arrivals of Juan Pablo Ruíz Gómez, Nicolás Miracco and Juan Galeano. Renso Pérez left for Atlético de Rafaela on 3 July. Nicolás Correa, a centre-back from Defensor Sporting, moved in on 3 July. Facundo Melivilo, who returned to Chacarita Juniors days prior, resigned on loan for 2019–20. A third incoming was also communicated, as Franco Cristaldo came from Boca Juniors. A day after, on 4 July, Ismael Quilez and Alexis Ferrero agreed departures.

Central Córdoba signed goalkeeper Diego Rodríguez from Defensa y Justicia on 5 July. Platense announced Alfredo Ramírez was to join them on 5 July. Pablo Ortega departed on 8 July, securing a contract with Ferro Carril Oeste back in Primera B Nacional. Emanuel Cuevas switched Torneo Federal A for the Primera División on 10 July, as he received a deal with Central Córdoba from San Jorge. Leonardo Villalba and Leandro Requena joined from Defensa y Justicia and Los Andes on 12 July. Central Córdoba travelled to the Predio Armando Pérez to face Belgrano in friendlies on 13 July, ending the day with a draw and a loss. Matías Nani, from Roma, and Lisandro Alzugaray, from Newell's Old Boys, were added on loan to Gustavo Coleoni's squad on 13/14 July.

Also on 13 July, Ezequiel Barrionuevo went to Ecuador with Atlético Porteño. Colombian centre-forward José Adolfo Valencia arrived from Portugal's Feirense on 16 July. On that day, Central Córdoba were held to back-to-back 1–1 draws by second tier Instituto. Valencia was followed through the door by Maximiliano Acuña, Jonathan Herrera and Francisco Manenti (loan) on 17 July. Javier Rossi headed off to Platense on 18 July. Hours prior, Central Córdoba failed to gain their first win of pre-season after a defeat to Atlético Camioneros Córdoba and a tie with General Paz Juniors. They won their first exhibition fixture on 21 July, drawing in normal time with Talleres before going perfect in the subsequent shoot-out; Jonathan Herrera scored the decisive kick for Central Córdoba.

Another player arrived to Central Córdoba on 21 July, as Nicolás Femia exited Sacachispas. Leonel Ferroni came on loan from Newell's on 22 July, reuniting with Alzugaray and Manenti. 24 July saw César Taborda go to Guillermo Brown. Juan Ignacio Barbieri signed terms from Ferro Carril Sud de Olavarría on 25 July, as Diego Jara left for All Boys.

July
Newell's Old Boys, on 28 July, condemned Central Córdoba to defeat in their first match of the Primera División in 2019–20. Joao Rodríguez joined Central Córdoba on 30 July 2019, having spent the previous six months without a club after his release by Chelsea. Gervasio Núñez was the next new face in, as he came from Atlético Tucumán on 31 July.

August
Boca Juniors youngster Oscar Salomón agreed a loan move to Central Córdoba on 1 August. Central Córdoba won the first three points in their return to the Primera División over Atlético Tucumán on 3 August, with Nicolás Femia scoring early on in a 1–0 victory. Luis Salces terminated his contract on 10 August; he later joined Gimnasia y Esgrima (M). Central Córdoba made it two Primera División matches unbeaten on 16 August after securing a point away to Talleres. Central Córdoba advanced into the Copa Argentina round of sixteen on 21 August, defeating Primera B Nacional's All Boys thanks to a goal from Joao Rodríguez. Central Córdoba held reigning champions Racing Club to a goalless draw at home on 25 August, prior to losing on the road to Lanús on 30 August.

Squad

Transfers
Domestic transfer windows:3 July 2019 to 24 September 201920 January 2020 to 19 February 2020.

Transfers in

Transfers out

Loans in

Friendlies

Pre-season
Belgrano released details of a pre-season friendly with Central Córdoba on 26 June 2019, with Ferroviario travelling to the Predio Armando Pérez in Córdoba on 13 July. Instituto revealed a match with them on 4 July. Central Córdoba confirmed the aforementioned fixtures on 7 July, while also announcing two further games; including against Talleres, which would be televised. The Instituto fixture was rescheduled from 15 July to 16 July on 14 July, as Atlético Camioneros Córdoba and General Paz Juniors were announced as opponents.

Competitions

Primera División

League table

Relegation table

Source: AFA

Results summary

Matches
The fixtures for the 2019–20 campaign were released on 10 July.

Copa Argentina

Central Córdoba were drawn with All Boys of Primera B Nacional in the Copa Argentina round of thirty-two. After advancing, Villa Mitre became their round of sixteen opponents.

Copa de la Superliga

Squad statistics

Appearances and goals

Statistics accurate as of 31 August 2019.

Goalscorers

Notes

References

Central Córdoba de Santiago del Estero seasons
Central Córdoba